The benihana is an aerial trick performed on a skateboard.

History

The benihana was invented by Lester Kasai and named after the Benihana restaurant chain.

Features

A benihana is performed by first getting airborne (for example from a vert ramp or an ollie). The skateboarder holds the tail of the skateboard deck with the back hand, while the back foot is taken off the skateboard and extended downwards. The front foot is straightened but kept on the board. When the front foot is extended, the tail of the board is brought close to the inner thigh of the front leg. 

However, the benihana as most skateboarders know it has been incorrectly labeled for years. The true benihana is only done when the skateboarder performs the motion as described above after riding up backwards (or "fakie") on a transition and landing back into the transition facing forwards. If the motion is performed while moving forwards it is known as a benibonga.

Virtually every instance of a benibonga ever recorded in skateboard videos, photos, magazines, and video games has been incorrectly labeled a benihana.

Popularity

The trick was very popular in the 1990s, with professional skateboarders like Jamie Thomas and Josh Kasper recognised for their proficiency with regard to the benihana. However, since that point, the popularity of the trick has waned.

The trick featured in the Tony Hawk video game series including Tony Hawk's Underground 2, released in 2004.

In 2008, Transworld Skateboarding magazine ran a feature that included the benihana in a list of the 10 Worst Tricks In Skateboarding and described the trick as "terrible".

References

External links
Sheckler and Dompierre Benihana (Transworld Skateboarding, 11 August 2008)
Chris Fauver, Benihana (Transworld Skateboarding, 2 March 2011)

Skateboarding tricks